Acacia acuaria is a shrub belonging to the genus Acacia and the subgenus Phyllodineae that is endemic to Western Australia.

Description
It has spiny glabrous branchlets with caducous stipules. It blooms from June to September and produces yellow flowers. The inflorescences occur singly and have spherical flower-heads containing 14 to 23 golden flowers.

Distribution
It is native to an area in the Mid West and  Wheatbelt regions of Western Australia from around Northampton in the north to around Yilgarn in the south east where it is found on sandplains, rises and around salt lakes growing in a variety of soil types as a part of Eucalyptus woodland or mallee scrub communities.

See also
List of Acacia species

References

acuaria
Acacias of Western Australia
Plants described in 1904
Taxa named by William Vincent Fitzgerald